Arya Kanya Gurukul situated at Porbandar, Gujarat, is a girls K-12 boarding school in India.

History
The school was set up in 1936 by Gujarati industrialist and philanthropist, Shri Nanji Kalidas Mehta, the founder of Mehta Group. His association with Gandhiji and inspiration he got from Arya Samaj leaders culminated into founding of the school. Nanji Kalidas was deeply influenced by Mahatma Gandhi and principle of Arya Samaj and he therefore made foundation stone of Gurukul to be laid by a Scheduled Caste girl, a revolutionary step in those times. The school have been visited by dignitaries like Dr. Rajendra Prasad, Dr. Radhakrishnan, Giani Zail Singh, Pt. Jawaharlal Nehru, Smt. Indira Gandhi, Shri Morarji Desai, Shri Rajiv Gandhi, Smt. Sonia Gandhi and more recently, the President Mrs. Pratibha Patil.

Ideology
The education system at Gurukul is a blend of Vedic heritage and modern educational systems with an orientation towards science and technology based on Arya Samaj principles.

Campus
The school complex is set amidst 90 acre sylvan surroundings.

References

Schools in Colonial India
Educational institutions established in 1936
Girls' schools in Gujarat
Private schools in Gujarat
1936 establishments in India
Porbandar